Spilogona latimana is a fly from the family Muscidae. It is found in New Zealand.

Description 
The male of this species is readily identified by its golden frons and antennae, and distinctive forelegs with elongated thin foretarsi and spatulate tarsal terminal segments.

References 

Insects described in 1931
Muscidae
Diptera of New Zealand
Taxa named by John Russell Malloch